Scott Beck (born October 22, 1984) and Bryan Woods (born September 14, 1984) are an American filmmaking duo. Together they co-wrote A Quiet Place, in addition to writing and directing Nightlight, Haunt, and 65.

Lives and careers 
Beck was born in Denver, Colorado and Woods was born in Davenport, Iowa. Both were raised in Bettendorf, Iowa. While attending the University of Iowa together, the two founded Bluebox Films and made the films Her Summer and University Heights. The pair secured a development deal with MTV Films after winning MTVU's Best Film on Campus competition with the film.

In 2015, Beck and Woods wrote and directed Nightlight, released by Lionsgate. In 2016, Beck and Woods sold their original screenplay for A Quiet Place to Paramount Pictures. The film stars Emily Blunt and John Krasinski, the latter of who also directed and co-wrote the script. A Quiet Place was released in April 2018 to critical acclaim; it has a Rotten Tomatoes approval rating of 95%. It became a major box office hit, grossing over $330 million worldwide.

The duo also wrote and directed the thriller Haunt, produced by Eli Roth. In June 2018, Beck and Woods signed on to write and executive-produce a film adaptation of Stephen King's short story The Boogeyman for 20th Century Fox and 21 Laps Entertainment. Beck & Woods developed the television series Zeroes for Sony Pictures Television and Davis Entertainment. The series is based on the novel by the New York Times best-selling author Scott Westerfeld, Margo Lanagan, and Deborah Biancotti.

In May 2020, it was announced that Beck and Woods would write, direct, and produce 65 for Sony Pictures and producer Sam Raimi. The film stars Adam Driver.

Filmography

Feature film

Short film

Television

References

External links
 
 
 Bluebox Films

Filmmaking duos